USS Pheasant (AM-61/MSF-61) was an  named after the Pheasant, a large game bird found in the United States and other countries.  Pheasant was laid down on 22 July 1942 at the Defoe Shipbuilding Company in Bay City, Michigan; launched on 24 October 1942, sponsored by Mrs. Harry J. Defoe, wife of the shipyard owner; and commissioned on 12 December 1942.

Following fitting out at Boston, Massachusetts, Pheasant helped to protect convoys along the eastern and gulf coasts of the United States beginning in early 1943. From 29 June until her departure for Oran, Algeria, on 15 July 1944, she cleared areas to be used for the invasion of Cherbourg, France. Later, in the Mediterranean, she made exploratory sweeps prior to the invasion of southern France. She swept successfully in the Mediterranean until May 1945 when she received orders to return to the United States.

Pheasant entered the Reserve Fleet at San Diego, California, in December 1945.  She was reclassified MSF-61 on 7 February 1955, struck from the Naval Vessel Register on 1 December 1966, and later sunk as a target.

Pheasant received two battle stars for World War II service.

See also
 Commander Mine Squadron SEVEN

References

External links
 Photo gallery at navsource.org

 

Auk-class minesweepers of the United States Navy
Ships built in Bay City, Michigan
1942 ships
World War II minesweepers of the United States
Ships sunk as targets